Stocks and Blondes is a 1928 American silent comedy film directed by Dudley Murphy and starring Gertrude Astor, Jacqueline Logan and Richard 'Skeets' Gallagher. It is also known by the alternative title of Blondes and Bonds.

Cast
 Gertrude Astor as Goldie  
 Jacqueline Logan as Patsy  
 Richard 'Skeets' Gallagher as Tom Greene  
 Albert Conti as Powers 
 Henry Roquemore

References

Bibliography
 Roy Liebman. From Silents to Sound: A Biographical Encyclopedia of Performers who Made the Transition to Talking Pictures. McFarland, 1998.

External links

1928 films
1928 comedy films
Silent American comedy films
Films directed by Dudley Murphy
American silent feature films
1920s English-language films
Film Booking Offices of America films
American black-and-white films
1920s American films